"Mademoiselle Ninette" is a song written and produced by Herbert Hildebrandt-Winhauer and originally performed by Soulful Dynamics. It was released in 1970, and became a number-one hit in Germany, Austria and Switzerland that year and was among the bestsellers for 30 weeks. More than half million copies were sold of the single.  
a cover by Michael Holm reached number two in South Africa.

Cover versions
Several other bands and singers recorded the song, among them:
 The Walkers (in Dutch)
 Michael Holm (1970 in English and in German - South Africa #2)
 James Last (1970)
 Las Ventanas (Mexican band) (1970, In Spanish)
 Hajo (1970, in German)
 Metronom (in Czech)
 Jigsaw (1972 - Australia #18)
 De Marlets (1988)
 Rondo Classico (1995)
 Sam Gooris (1996)
 Matthias Lens (2013)

References

 swisscharts.com

1970 songs
1970 singles
Number-one singles in Austria
Number-one singles in Germany
Number-one singles in Switzerland